Eynabad or Ainabad may refer to:
 Eynabad, East Azerbaijan
 Eynabad, Kabudarahang, Hamadan Province
 Eynabad, Razan, Hamadan Province
 Eynabad, Tuyserkan, Hamadan Province
 Eynabad, Markazi
 Eynabad, Fazl, Nishapur County, Razavi Khorasan Province